The LEK Lunar Expeditionary Complex was a lunar expedition and Moon base proposed by Valentin Glushko in 1974 as a Soviet response to the United States' Apollo program and as a successor to the Zvezda moonbase, which was based on the cancelled N1-L3 crewed Moon expedition program. If implemented, it was intended to have been operational by 1980 and used for scientific and engineering research.

Hardware 
The Vulkan-LEK project was based on new superheavy launcher developed in Glushko's bureau.

The moonbase design consisted of a number of modules, including:
 Lunokhod, an 8-ton pressurized lunar rover to be used to build the base and for expeditions.
 The LZM ("Laboratory-Factory Module"), a 15.5-ton pressurized module to be used for oxygen production and scientific experiments. 
 The LZhM ("Laboratory-Habitation Module"), 21.5-ton habitation module where cosmonauts were to reside.
 A nuclear power station to provide electricity.
 A simple transport vehicle to ferry supplies to and from a lunar orbit.

Project termination 
The project was cancelled in 1976 when a Russian Academy of Sciences Commission ruled that resources should be targeted toward projects primarily adding economic value rather than for national prestige.

See also 
 Zvezda (moonbase)
 Soviet Moonshot
 Space race

References

External links 
the LEK Lunar Expeditionary Complex at astronautix.com.
Entry at russianspaceweb.com.

Colonization of the Moon
Soviet lunar program